This is a list of the best-selling singles in 1990 in Japan, as reported by Oricon.

See also
List of Oricon number-one singles of 1990

References

1990 in Japanese music
1990
Oricon
Japanese music-related lists